Fazal-e-Akbar (born November 1903, date of death unknown) was chief justice of Pakistan. He graduated in Arts from St. Xavier College, Calcutta, India. He graduated in Law from University of Calcutta and was called to Bar from Lincoln's Inn, London in 1930.

He started his career as a lawyer at Fort William High Court in 1931. From 1931 to 1943 he also taught Jurisprudence at the University of Calcutta. In 1943, he was appointed District and Sessions Judge, in which capacity he worked till 1946.

After the partition of India he became Special Officer of the Judicial Department and Registrar East Pakistan High Court. In 1949 he was elevated as the Judge of the High Court of East Pakistan. Justice Fazal-e-Akbar was deputed as Chairman Railway Tribunal in 1950 and Chairman University Commission in 1954.

He was elevated to the Supreme Court of Pakistan in May 1960. Justice Fazal-e-Akbar became the sixth Chief Justice of Pakistan replacing Dr. Justice S.A. Rehman on 4 June 1968. He retired on 17 November 1968.

See also
Chief Justices of Pakistan
Supreme Court of Pakistan

References

1903 births
Chief justices of Pakistan
Muhajir people
Pakistani judges
University of Calcutta alumni
Academic staff of the University of Calcutta
Year of death missing